Martha Maria Norelius (January 22, 1909 – September 25, 1955) was a Swedish-born American competition swimmer, Olympic gold medalist, and former world record-holder in five different freestyle swimming events.

Biography
Norelius was born in Stockholm, Sweden in 1911.  Her father was Swedish Olympic swimmer Charles Norelius, who was also her swimming coach.

She was first recognized for her swimming and diving skills just after her seventh birthday, at an exhibition at the Greenbrier pool, where her father was a swimming instructor. He too had been an Olympic swimmer for Sweden and at the Summer Olympics 1912 in Stockholm offered a position in Florida to train the American swimming team. Daughter Martha became very good friends with top swimmer Johnny Weissmüller also trained by Marthas father Charles. At the age of 15, she represented the United States at the 1924 Summer Olympics in Paris.  Norelius won the gold medal in the women's 400-meter freestyle in 1924, setting a new Olympic record (6:02.2), and edging fellow Americans Helen Wainwright (6:03.8) and Gertrude Ederle (6:04.8).  Four years later, at the 1928 Summer Olympics in Amsterdam, she won two more gold medals.  First, in individual competition, she won the women's 400-meter freestyle, breaking her own record with a new world mark of 5:42.8, and defeating Dutch swimmer Marie Braun by fifteen seconds.  In the women's 4×100-meter freestyle relay event, Norelius and her American teammates Eleanor Garatti, Adelaide Lambert and Albina Osipowich, won the gold medal and set a new world record in both the event final (4:47.6).

Between 1925 and 1929, Norelius won eleven individual Amateur Athletic Union (AAU) titles and set at least 19 world and 30 American records.  She remains the only woman to have received two Olympic back-to-back gold medals in the 400-meter freestyle.

In 1929 she turned professional and won the ten-mile Wrigley Marathon in Toronto.  There she met Canadian Olympic rower Joseph Wright Jr., and later married him on March 15, 1930. They had a daughter Diane born in February 1931.

Norelius died in 1955, only 46 years old, following gall bladder surgery and was buried in Bellefontaine Cemetery. She was inducted into the International Swimming Hall of Fame as an "honor swimmer" in 1967.

See also
 List of members of the International Swimming Hall of Fame
 List of multiple Olympic gold medalists
 List of Olympic medalists in swimming (women)
 World record progression 200 metres freestyle
 World record progression 400 metres freestyle
 World record progression 800 metres freestyle
 World record progression 1500 metres freestyle
 World record progression 4 × 100 metres freestyle relay

References

External links

 
 

1909 births
1955 deaths
Swimmers from Stockholm
American female freestyle swimmers
World record setters in swimming
Olympic gold medalists for the United States in swimming
Swedish emigrants to the United States
Swimmers at the 1924 Summer Olympics
Swimmers at the 1928 Summer Olympics
Medalists at the 1928 Summer Olympics
Medalists at the 1924 Summer Olympics
20th-century American women